Rissoina punctostriata is a species of minute sea snail, a marine gastropod mollusk or micromollusk in the family Rissoinidae.

Description
The height of the shell attains 10 mm.

Distribution
This species occurs in the Atlantic Ocean off Mauritania, Senegal, Angola, the Cape Verdes, São Tomé and Príncipe.

References

 Talavera, F.G. (1975) Moluscos de sedimentos de la plataforma continental de Mauritania. Boletín del Instituto Español de Oceanografía, 192, 1-18, 4 pls. NIZT 682
 Gofas S. (1999). The West African Rissoidae (Gastropoda: Rissooidea) and their similarities to some European species. The Nautilus 113(3): 78-101
 Rolán E. & Luque Á.A. 2000. The subfamily Rissoininae (Mollusca: Gastropoda: Rissoidae) in the Cape Verde Archipelago (West África). Iberus 18(1): 21-94
 Rolán E., 2005. Malacological Fauna From The Cape Verde Archipelago. Part 1, Polyplacophora and Gastropoda

Rissoinidae
Molluscs of the Atlantic Ocean
Molluscs of Angola
Gastropods of Cape Verde
Invertebrates of West Africa
Invertebrates of São Tomé and Príncipe
Gastropods described in 1975